José Pedro Varela Berro (19 March 1845 - 24 October 1879) was an Uruguayan sociologist, journalist, politician, and educator. He was born in Montevideo.
Uruguay adopted free, compulsory, and secular education in 1876, thanks to his efforts. It was because of Varela that Uruguay established the 1877 Law of Common Education, which continues to influence Uruguay. The José Pedro Varela National School is named after him.

Early life
José Pedro Varela was born on 19 March 1845 in Montevideo. He was the son of Benita Gumersinda Berro Larrañaga and Jacobo Dionisio Varela Sanxines.

See also 
 Lorenzo Latorre

References 

1845 births
1879 deaths
People from Montevideo
Uruguayan people of Galician descent
Uruguayan sociologists
Uruguayan politicians
Uruguayan journalists
Uruguayan educators
19th-century journalists
Male journalists
19th-century male writers
Burials at the Central Cemetery of Montevideo